The mylohyoid nerve (or nerve to mylohyoid) is a mixed nerve of the head. It is a branch of the inferior alveolar nerve. It supplies the mylohyoid muscle, and the anterior belly of the digastric muscle. It may also supply mandibular (lower) molar teeth, requiring local anaesthesia for some oral procedures.

Structure 
The mylohyoid nerve is a branch of the inferior alveolar nerve, a branch of the mandibular nerve (CN V3), itself a branch of the trigeminal nerve (CN V). It contains both motor neurons and sensory neurons. It branches just before it enters the mandibular foramen. It descends in a groove on the deep surface of the ramus of the mandible. When it reaches the under surface of the mylohyoid muscle, it gives branches to both the mylohyoid muscle and the anterior belly of the digastric muscle.

Function 
The mylohyoid nerve supplies the mylohyoid muscle and the anterior belly of the digastric muscle. It may also give some sensory supply to the mandibular (lower) molar teeth. In addition to the sensory innervation to the teeth, this nerve also provides cutaneous supply to the center of the submental area.

Clinical significance 
The mylohyoid nerve needs to be blocked during local anaesthesia of the mandibular (lower) teeth to prevent pain during oral procedures. It may not be anaesthetised during a block of the inferior alveolar nerve, causing pain.

Additional images

References

External links 
  - "Infratemporal Fossa: The Inferior Alveolar Nerve and the Vessels"
 
 
 

Nerves of the head and neck